Barinus is a genus of flower weevils in the family Curculionidae. There are about 14 described species in Barinus.

Species
 Barinus albescens (LeConte, 1880)
 Barinus bivittatus (LeConte, 1878)
 Barinus confusus Sleeper, 1956
 Barinus convexicollis Sleeper, 1956
 Barinus cribricollis (LeConte, 1876)
 Barinus curticollis Casey, 1892
 Barinus debilis Casey, 1920
 Barinus difficilis Casey, 1892
 Barinus elusus Blatchley, 1920
 Barinus linearis (LeConte, 1876)
 Barinus lutescens (LeConte, 1880)
 Barinus productus (Casey, 1920)
 Barinus robustus (Blatchley, 1920)
 Barinus suffusus Casey, 1892

References

Further reading

 
 
 
 

Baridinae